Koda Kumi 20th Anniversary Tour 2020 My Name Is... (stylized as KODA KUMI 20th ANNIVERSARY TOUR 2020 MY NAME IS...) is a live concert DVD by Japanese singer-songwriter Koda Kumi, and coincides with her compilation album My Name Is.... The DVD was released on March 10, 2021. It peaked at No. 3 on the Oricon DVD charts and remained on the charts for nine weeks.

The concert was released for purchase on Blu-ray and DVD, a limited 3DVD+2CD edition, and a limited 3Blu-ray+2CD edition.

Information
Koda Kumi 20th Anniversary Tour 2020 My Name Is... is Japanese artist Koda Kumi's twentieth concert DVD/Blu-ray, released on March 10, 2020. The tour coincided with her compilation album My Name Is..., which had been released as a fan club exclusive on 
September 11, 2020. The tour was only held in four locations, with a total of ten shows due to the COVID-19 pandemic. The tour began in Osaka at Osaka-jo Hall on September 12, and ended in Shibuya at Yoyogi National Gymnasium on December 6.

The concert charted at No. 5 on the weekly Oricon DVD charts and No. 8 on the Oricon Blu-ray Charts, charting for nine weeks and four weeks, respectively.

The live was released to the public as a standard 2DVD set and a higher quality 2Blu-ray set. A limited 3DVD+2CD and 3Blu-ray+2CD were released to Koda Kumi's official fan club Koda Gumi.

The performance utilized on the DVD and Blu-ray was of her December 6 performance at Yoyogi National Stadium. The date coincided with her debut, which began with her song "Take Back" on December 6, 2000.

COVID-19 precautions
Due to the COVID-19 pandemic, there were limited shows of the tour. As a precaution to those who attended, masks were required and seating was spaced to encourage social distancing. Venues were only held at half capacity and temperature readings were required before entry.

Track listing

Tour dates and locations
The tour had limited shows due to the COVID-19 pandemic in Japan, and were only held in four locations with two performances each day: Osaka-jō Hall, Marine Messe Fukuoka, Nagoya Civic Assembly Hall and Yoyogi National Gymnasium. The tour ran for three months between September to December 2020.

September 12, 2020: Osaka-jo Hall
October 4, 2020: Marine Messe Fukuoka
October 10, 2020: Nagoya Civic Assembly Hall
December 5, 2020: Yoyogi National Stadium
December 6, 2020: Yoyogi National Stadium

Charts (Japan)

External links
Koda Kumi Official

References

2021 video albums
Koda Kumi video albums
Live video albums